The CANT 12 was a flying boat and training aircraft that was produced in Italy in the 1920s.

Design
The CANT 12 was a traditional center-shaped seaplane for the era. The hull was characterized by an open cockpit in an advanced position that ended posteriorly in a single-headed cruciform fletching and horizontal braced planes. The wing configuration was biplana, with wings of equal size connected to each other by a series of uprights and tie rods, with the lower one equipped with small floating balancers.

Development
The CANT 12 was developed in 1926 as a variant of the previous CANT 7. The prototype was built at the Monfalcone shipyard but after flight test results were unsatisfactory and the development program was cancelled.

Specifications

See also

References

Further reading
 

cant 12
1920s Italian civil trainer aircraft
Flying boats
Biplanes
Single-engined pusher aircraft
Aircraft first flown in 1926